Prince of Liège (French: Prince de Liège, Dutch: Prins van Luik, German: Prinz von Lüttich) is a substantive title awarded by King Leopold III of the Belgians to his younger son, Prince Albert (the future King Albert II), while he was second in line to the throne of Belgium on 7 June, 1934. The title was used from that date until his accession as King of the Belgians on 9 August 1993. His wife, the former Queen Paola, was known as the Princess of Liège from their marriage in 1959 until their accession in 1993.

Albert's elder brother Prince Baudouin (the future King Baudouin) was known as the Duke of Brabant at the time of Albert's birth. The title Count of Hainaut was traditionally reserved for the eldest son of the crown prince and King Leopold's brother held the title of Count of Flanders. This meant that all the commonly used titles in the Belgian Royal Household had been given, so a new style had to be created.

The title is reminiscent of the Prince-Bishopric of Liège, a noble title of the Holy Roman Empire. That title ceased to exist in 1795.

King Albert II decided in 2001 to no longer award substantive titles such as Count of Flanders, Count of Hainaut, and Prince of Liège. The heir to the throne is awarded the title Duke or Duchess of Brabant. It is currently held by Princess Elisabeth, Duchess of Brabant. It is therefore likely that Albert II will be the only Prince of Liège.

Princes of Liège (Kingdom of Belgium)
 Albert (1934–1993)

20th century in Belgium
Noble titles created in 1934
1934 establishments in Belgium